There are a number of works with England's Looking Glass in the title. During the 
16th and 17th centuries looking glass, meaning mirror, was frequently used in the titles of books.

Thomas Lodge and Robert Greene, A Looking Glass for London and England (c.1590), an Elizabethan era stage play
Edmund Calamy the Elder, England's Looking Glass (1642)
William Mercer (poet), "Angliae speculum, or, England's Looking-Glasse" (1646)
 Elizabeth Pool, The Bloudy Almanack, or England's Looking-Glass (1651). (Containing the Scots Prophesie to their King)
 Rowlinson,  "A Recollection of the Times, or England's Looking-Glass" (1680). It is a ballad that begins "0 Sinful World ! rouse up thy sleepy head ..."

See also
 Richard Graham Preston, "Angliae Speculum Morale: The Moral State of England, with the Several Aspects it Beareth to Virtue and Vice" (1670)
 Simon Patrick, "Angliæ speculum: a glass that flatters not" (1678)

Further reading
 Edmund Calamy the Elder, 'A Sermon at London On The Solemn League & Covenant', 14 January 1645.
"I may truly call these nineteen sins, England's looking-glass, wherein we may see what are the clouds that eclipse God's countenance from shining upon us".

Notes and references

English Renaissance plays